
Jinshi was the highest degree offered by the ancient Chinese Imperial Examination.

Jinshi can also refer to:

History of Jin or Jin Shi, a 14th-century history book on the Jurchen Jin dynasty

Places
Jinshi City, a county-level city in Changde, Hunan
Jinshi Lake, a lake in Sanmin District, Kaohsiung, Taiwan

Towns
Jinshi, Guangdong, in Chao'an District, Chaozhou, Guangdong
Jinshi, Lianyuan, in Lianyuan, Hunan
Jinshi, Xiangxiang, in Xiangxiang, Hunan
Jinshi, Xinning County, in Xinning County, Hunan
Jinshi, Dazhou, in Tongchuan District, Dazhou, Sichuan
Jinshi, Santai County, in Santai County, Sichuan

Townships
Jinshi Township, Hunan, in Xiangtan County, Hunan
Jinshi Township, Jiangxi, in Suichuan County, Jiangxi